In Turkey there were 141 newspapers in 1941 of which total circulation was nearly 60,000 copies. The number of newspapers became 2002 in 1946.

List of national newspapers in Turkey

Below is a list of national printed newspapers published in Turkey. Initial sort order is by weekly circulation (as of 02.05.2016 - 08.05.2016).

Newspapers in other languages
Below is a list of foreign-language newspapers published in Turkey.

Local newspapers
{{columns-list|
Adana
 Adana Haber
 Adana Yerel Haber
 Başak Gazetesi
 Bölge
 Ekspres Gazetesi
 Esenler Haber
 Medya Yenigün
 Yeni Adana
 Yeni Gün
Adıyaman
 Adıyaman Haber
 Çağdaş Gölbaşı
Afyonkarahisar  Afyon Haber Afyon Odak Gazete Gerçek Sandıklı HaberAmasya
 Bilgi GazetesiAnkara
 Gazete Ankara Sonsöz GazetesiAntalya
 Akdeniz Beyaz Akdeniz Gerçek Akdeniz Haber Akdeniz Manşet Akdeniz Telgraf Akseki'nin Sesi Alanya Antalya Antalya Gündem Ayyıldız Toros Demokrat Gazete Ekspres Gazete Bir Hilal Hürses İleri Kemer Gözcü Kent Manavgat Gazetesi Manavgat Nehir Manavgat'ın Sesi Gazetesi Son Haber Yeni Alanya Yeni YüzyılArtvin
 08 Haber Artvin Medya Artvin Gazetesi Çoruh PostasıAydın
 Aydın Denge Aydın Ses Hedef Gazetesi Mücadele GazetesiBalıkesir
 Ayvalık Sözcü İlk Haber Körfez'in Sesi GazetesiBatman
 Batman Çağdaş Batman Doğuş Batman Express Batman Gazetesi Batman Haber Portalı Batman PostasıBayburt
 Yeşil Bayburt GazetesiBingöl
 Bingöl Gazetesi Bingöl'ün SesiBolu
 Bolu Express Bolu Gündem Bolu Olay Bolu'da Yenihayat Bolu'nun Sesi Geredemiz Yeni UfukBurdur
 Burdurlu'nun Sesi Hedef GazetesiBursa
 Bursa Hakimiyet Bursa Olay Gazetesi Bursa.com Bursada Bugün Kent GazetesiÇanakkale
 Ayvacık Gazetesi Burası Çanakkale Çanakkale Haber Çanakkale Olay Gazete Boğaz Gelibolu Lapseki GazetesiÇankırı
 Çankırı'nın SesiÇorum
 Çorum Dost Haber Çorum HaberDenizli
 Demokrasi Zemini Denizli Haber DenizliliDiyarbakır
 Diyarbakır Diyarbakır Söz Güneydoğu EkspresDüzce
 Düzce Damla GazetesiEdirne
 Edirne Gazetesi Edirne'nin Sesi Trakya Net Haber Trakya'nın SesiElazığ
 Elaziz.netErzincan
 Özsöz GazetesiErzurum
 Erzurum GazetesiEskişehir
 Eshaber Eskişehir SakaryaGaziantep
 Güncel Gazetesi Olay MedyaGiresun
 Giresun Işık Özbulancak GazetesiHakkâri
 Yüksekova HaberHatay
 Antakya Gazetesi Hatay Gazetesi Hürhaber Kardelen Gazetesi Kırıkhan.net ÖzyurtIğdır
 Çağdaş Gazetesi Güven Gazetesi Hudut Gazetesi Yeşil Iğdır GazetesiIsparta
 Gülses Isparta Manşetİskenderun
 Güney GazetesiIstanbul
 Ataköy Gazete Bakırköy Postası Beşiktaş Gazetesi Bölge Gazetesi Çağdaş Kadıköy Esenler Haber Gazete Beşiktaş Gazete Boğaz Güzel Vatan Kartal Gazetesi Özden Gazetesi Pendik Son Söz Yaşam Gazetesi Yerel Haber Yöremizİzmir
 Aliağa Ekspres Demokrat Aliağa Demokrat Urla Gazete Karşıyakalı Haber Ekspres İzmir Son Dakika Kuşadası Haber Kuzey Ege Menderes Postası Menemen'in Sesi Yarım Ada Yeni AsırKahramanmaraş
 Elbistan'ın Sesi Kahraman Maraş Gazetesi Kayzen Kent MaraşKars
 Kars Postası Siyasal BirikimKastamonu
 Kastamonu PostasıKayseri
 Kayseri Gündem Kayseri HaberKırıkkale
 Yeşilyurt GazetesiKilis
 Kilis PostasıKocaeli
 Bizim Kocaeli Gebze Gazetesi Gebze Haber Haberci 41 Kocaeli Gazetesi Öncü Haber Özgür Kocaeli Yeni HaberKonya
 Çumra Postası Hakimiyet İlk Haber İstasyon Gazetesi Memleket Gazetesi Merhaba Gazetesi Pervasız (Akşehir) Yeni Konya Yeni MeramKaraman
 Anadolu Manşet Karaman'da Uyanış Yeşil ErmenekKütahya
 Bizim Tavşanlı Kütahya Gazetesi Tavşanlı'nın Sesi Tellal Yeni KütahyaMalatya
 Darende Haber Malatya Haber Malatyam.com Son Söz GazetesiManisa
 Manisa HaberMersin
 Güney Gazetesi Mersin Haber Mersin Radikal Gazetesi Tarsus Haber Telgraf Türk Haber Postası Mersin Blok Haber Tarsus Gazetesi Çamlıyayla HaberMuğla
 Bodrum Yarımada Güney Ege Marmaris Gündem Marmaris Sun Muğla HaberOsmaniye
 Başak Gazetesi Düziçi Erdem Gazetesi Erdem GazetesiSakarya
 Adapazarı Gazetesi Bizim Sakarya Sakarya Akşam Gazetesi Sakarya Yenigün Sakarya Yenihaber Yeni SakaryaSamsun
 Halk Gazetesi Kuzey HaberSiirt
 Siirt Mücadele GazetesiSivas
 Gürün Haber Sivas Haber Sivas Hakikat Sivas Postası Sularbasi-Haber/Gürün Yeni ÜlkeŞanlıurfa
 Güneydoğu Gazetesi Şanlıurfa Sivas Haberler/Urfa Urfa Haber "Urfa Haber Tv"
Tekirdağ
 Çerkezköy Haber Şarköy'ün SesiTokat
 Yeşil NiksarTrabzon
 Akçaabat Yeni Haber Bölgede Gündem Hüryol Karadeniz Gazetesi Karadeniz Haber Karadeniz'den Günebakış Kuzey Ekspres Gazetesi Pulathanehaber Taka Trabzon'un Sesi Türk Sesi Gazetesi Yerel sporYalova
 Yalova 77 Yalova LifeYozgat
 Sorgun PostasıZonguldak
 Değişim Gazetesi Karabük Net Zonguldak NetKaradeniz Ereğli
 Değişim Gazetesi}}

Online newspapers
These are official online newspapers on the Alexa Top 100 list.

 En Son Haber Haberler Haber 
 İnternet Haber Mynet Haber NtvMsnbc Lagiye Gazete Oku Turkey News Wall Street Journal Türkiye''

References

External links 

 
Turkey
Newspapers